Esraa Elsayed Rashed Elsayed Ahmed (born 21 November 1998) is an Egyptian weightlifter. At the 2016 Summer Olympics she competed in the Women's -63 kg. She won silver medals at the 2013 Mediterranean Games in the 58 kg event, and at the 2015 African Games in the 63 kg event.

Major competitions

References

External links
 
 
 
 

1998 births
Living people
Olympic weightlifters of Egypt
Weightlifters at the 2016 Summer Olympics
African Games silver medalists for Egypt
African Games medalists in weightlifting
Mediterranean Games silver medalists for Egypt
Mediterranean Games medalists in weightlifting
Competitors at the 2015 African Games
Competitors at the 2013 Mediterranean Games
Competitors at the 2019 African Games
20th-century Egyptian women
21st-century Egyptian women
Egyptian female weightlifters